My Lottery Dream Home is an American reality television series on HGTV featuring home buyers who have won lotteries or suddenly inherited a large sum of money. It is hosted by David Bromstad. It premiered on March 7, 2015. It is produced by 7Beyond (now Beyond Productions US), a joint venture between Beyond International and Seven Network.

On January 1, 2021, a spin-off hosted by Laurence Llewelyn-Bowen titled My Lottery Dream Home International premiered.

Premise
The show follows David Bromstad as he helps lottery winners find a luxurious property after striking it rich.

Production
Season 1 premiered on March 7, 2015. Season 2 premiered on January 6, 2017. Season 3 premiered on June 2, 2017. Season 4 premiered on February 9, 2018. Season 5 premiered on September 21, 2018. Season 6 premiered on January 1, 2019. Season 7 premiered on April 5, 2019. Season 8 premiered on December 13, 2019. Season 9 premiered on November 20, 2020. Season 10 premiered on May 7, 2021. Season 11 premiered on November 12, 2021.

Series overview

Episodes

Season 1 (2015–16)

Season 2 (2017)

Season 3 (2017–18)

Season 4 (2018)

Season 5 (2018)

Season 6 (2019)

Season 7 (2019)

Season 8 (2019–20)

Season 9 (2020–21)

Season 10 (2021)

Season 11 (2021-2022)

My Lottery Dream Home International
My Lottery Dream Home International, hosted by Laurence Llewelyn-Bowen, premiered on 1 January 2021.

References

2010s American reality television series
2020s American reality television series
HGTV original programming
Television series by Beyond Television Productions
2015 American television series debuts